Rose Vesper was a member of the Ohio House of Representatives from 1993–2000 for the 72nd district, a portion of Clermont County, Ohio. She was succeeded by Tom Niehaus at the beginning of 2001.

Early life
Vesper was born in Cincinnati, Ohio. She obtained a Bachelor of Arts from Xavier University and a Master of Arts from Midwestern University. She worked as a school teacher from 1984 to 1992.

Before entering and during her term in public office Vesper ran her own farm, growing tobacco, alfalfa, and cattle. Due to her experience and interest in farming tobacco, Vesper was a member of an Ohio "Tobacco Settlement Task Force" in 1999.

Public career
Vesper entered public office as a member of the Ohio parliament on 3 January 1993.

In 2001, Vesper was nominated as Ohio's regional economic development representative by then governor, Bob Taft.

In 2002, Vesper won the Matha Dorsey Award for economic achievement.

Notes

External links

Republican Party members of the Ohio House of Representatives
Women state legislators in Ohio
Living people
Year of birth missing (living people)
Xavier University alumni
People from New Richmond, Ohio
21st-century American women